Andrés Ruzo is a geoscientist, conservationist, author, science communicator and educator, who became the first scientist granted permission to study the Boiling River of the Amazon in 2011.

And in 2002, he was awarded with the National Geographic Young Explorer Grantee.

He is married and his wife also works as his field partner.

A tri-citizen, Andrés grew up between Peru, Nicaragua, and the United States, all countries where he now has active projects. He holds degrees in Geology and Finance from Southern Methodist University (Dallas, TX), where he is currently finishing a Ph.D. in Geophysics. 

His business-related work primarily focuses on energy and project finance, and most recently, on building sustainable economic systems to catalyze Amazonian conservation. Through his geoscientific work, he has experience in various aspects of energy and resource exploration and development, including work with water quality, building materials, and even jewelry and precious stones. However, his primary geoscientific focus is in the field of volcanology and geothermal studies, looking to understand geothermal systems for academic, conservation, and geothermal energy exploration. Ultimately, he believes that environmental responsibility and economic prosperity can go hand in hand, and uses his work to unite both aims. Andrés believes that education serves as the catalyst to this goal, and he works with elementary through higher education on a weekly basis, giving talks, workshops, and short courses, as well as actively contributing to National Geographic Learning educational materials.

He is also the Founder and Director of the “Boiling River Project,” a non-profit dedicated to understanding and protecting the sacred Boiling River of the Amazon (i.e., the Shanay-Timpishka Geothermal System) by bringing together modern science, conservation economics, and traditional Amazonian knowledge.

Andrés has been a National Geographic Explorer since 2010, receiving multiple grants for his projects in Perú. He has been featured on various NatGeo outlets, including the Magazine, Channel, and Digital Media. He is currently the Partnership Ambassador for the LEGO-NatGeo Partnership (to be released in summer 2017), as well as the host for a show in the works on NatGeo Latin America (Spanish channel).

Andrés is a TED Main Stage Speaker and TED Book Author. He has received various awards and recognitions from industry associations and conservation groups, including the Geothermal Resources Council, the American Association of Petroleum Geologists, and Greenpeace.

Works

References

External links 

 
 
National Geographic explorers' page (Andrés A. Ruzo) 
 Boiling River of The Amazon

Year of birth missing
Place of birth missing
Southern Methodist University alumni